The Methodist Episcopal Church is a historic Methodist church, located at 256 S. 1st Avenue in Yuma, Arizona. It was long home to the Christian Science Society – Yuma, starting in 1946. The building was sold in 2019.

The Mission Revival Style church was built in 1905.

It was added to the National Register of Historic Places in 1982.

See also
 List of historic properties in Yuma, Arizona 
 National Register of Historic Places listings in Yuma County, Arizona

References

Buildings and structures in Yuma, Arizona
Methodist churches in Arizona
Churches on the National Register of Historic Places in Arizona
Churches completed in 1905
Mission Revival architecture in Arizona
National Register of Historic Places in Yuma County, Arizona
1905 establishments in Arizona Territory